is a Japanese manga written by Hideki Kakinuma and illustrated by Yusuke Tsurugi with character designs by Eeji Komatsu. It was serialized in Dengeki Comic Gao!. The manga was licensed in English by ComicsOne before the license was transferred to DrMaster.

Manga
The manga was released by MediaWorks between February 27, 2003 and February 27, 2004. The English release of the manga released the first of three tankōbon volumes on April 5, 2005.

Volume listing

Novels
The manga has been adapted into 5 novels, all written by Hideki Kakinuma and illustrated by Eeji Komatsu. The first three volumes were published in English by DrMaster.

Drama CDs
In January and March 2003, two Junk Force audio drama CDs were released by King Records in Japan. These CDs featured both new material and adaptations of stories featured in the manga and the novels. Professional voice actors were cast and possibly intended to be retained had the planned anime series reached fruition. The CDs are out of print.

The cast included:

 Sōichirō Hoshi - Louis
 Nana Mizuki - Liza
 Yū Asakawa - Wooty
 Ai Shimizu - Mill
 Hisayo Mochizuki - Mamet

Reception
Mania.com's Eduardo M. Chavez commends the manga on character design and the translation of sound effects.

Theron Martin at Anime News Network commends the novel for "good extrapolation of future military tech" but criticises it for the author's "unsophisticated writing style". Mania.com's Mike Dungan criticises the poor translation done by DrMaster. However, he commends the author for putting "mecha-fanservice" into the novel.

References

External links

2003 Japanese novels
2003 manga
Action anime and manga
ASCII Media Works manga
Kadokawa Dwango franchises
ComicsOne titles
Light novels
Shōnen manga